Pitcairnia patentiflora is a species of flowering plant in the family Bromeliaceae, native to northern South America (northern Brazil, Colombia, French Guiana and Venezuela). It was first described by Lyman Bradford Smith in 1939.

References

patentiflora
Flora of Brazil
Flora of Colombia
Flora of French Guiana
Flora of Venezuela
Plants described in 1939